The United States competed at the 2016 Summer Paralympics in Rio de Janeiro, Brazil, from 7 September to 18 September 2016. The first places the team qualified were for three athletes in sailing events. They also qualified athletes in archery, goalball, shooting, swimming, and wheelchair basketball.

Team 
The United States had a team of 267 sportspeople scheduled to compete in 20 different sports at the 2016 Games.  The team was 17% larger than the one that compete at the 2012 Summer Paralympics.  The USA qualified a team in each of the 8 different team sports at the Games, the first time this happened since the 2004 Summer Paralympics.  Of the 267 sportspeople in Rio, 142 were participating at the Games another time, having already participated in a previous Games.

The United States delegation included thirty veterans.  The team had three active service members. Forty-three states and Washington DC were represented in Rio. The state with the greatest number of representatives was California, with 29.   Michigan and Washington both sent 14 athletes.

To generate interest in the Games, the USOC organized US Paralympics’ Road to Rio Tour.  This 10 tour involved nine stops around the United States and officially got underway on July 4, 2015.

Medalists

Archery 

The United States qualified eight archers for the Rio Games following their performance at the 2015 World Archery Para Championships.

Men 

|-
|align=left|Jeff Fabry
|align=left|Men's individual compound W1
|596
|11
|L 126-140
|colspan=5|Did not advance
|-
|align=left|KJ Polish
|align=left rowspan=3|Men's individual compound open
|685
|2
|W 143-129
|L 133-139
|colspan=4|Did not advance
|-
|align=left|Andre Shelby
|669
|12
|W 143-131
|W 138-133
|W 142-141
|W 139-138
|W 144-143
|
|-
|align=left|Matt Stutzman
|684
|4
|W 142-129
|L 141-142
|colspan=4|Did not advance
|-
|align=left|Eric Bennett
|align=left rowspan=2|Men's individual recurve open
|622
|7
|W 7-3
|W 6-4
|L 0-6
|colspan=3|Did not advance
|-
|align=left|Michael Lukow
|577
|23
|L 0-6
|colspan=5|Did not advance
|}

Women 

|-
|align=left|Lia Coryell
|align=left|Women's individual compound W1
|535
|7
|colspan=2 
|L 115-134
|colspan=3|Did not advance
|-
|align=left|Samantha Tucker
|align=left|Women's individual compound open
|597
|17
|L 124-133
|colspan=5|Did not advance
|}

Teams 

|-
|align=left|Jeff Fabry Lia Coryell
|align=left|Team compound W1
|1131
|3
|colspan=2 
|W 128-113
|L 125-137
|L 129-137
|4
|-
|align=left|KJ Polish Samantha Tucker
|align=left|Team compound open
|1282
|9
|
|L 146-147
|colspan=4|Did not advance
|}

Athletics 
With 62 athletes and 4 guides, the US athletics delegation is the largest in the country's history. Roderick Townsend is a high jumper on the American team. Grace Norman and Allysa Seely competed in both athletics and paratriathlon in Rio.

Men's track

Men's field

Women's track

Women's field

Cycling 

With one pathway for qualification being one highest ranked NPCs on the UCI Para-Cycling male and female Nations Ranking Lists on 31 December 2014, the United States qualified for the 2016 Summer Paralympics in Rio, assuming they continued to meet all other eligibility requirements.

Allison Jones went to Rio as the American with the most Paralympic Games appearance.  Rio was her eighth Games. Oksana Masters had previously competed at the Paralympics in other sports, medalling in rowing at the 2012 Summer Paralympics in Rio and competing in Nordic skiing at the Winter Games.

Equestrian 
The country qualified to participate in the team event at the Rio Games.  They earned additional individual slots via the Para Equestrian Individual Ranking List Allocation method following the suspension of Russia, and France Finland not using one of their allocated spots.

Football 7-a-side 

United States national 7-a-side football team qualified for the Rio Paralympics at 2015 World Championships because of their seventh-place finish.

The draw for the tournament was held on May 6 at the  2016 Pre Paralympic Tournament in Salou, Spain.  The United States was put into Group B with Argentina, Netherlands and Russia. Iran qualified for the 2016 Rio Games following the suspension of Russia.  The IPC ruled that there could not be a redraw for the groups.  This resulted in Iran being put into Group A with the Netherlands, Argentina and the United States.

The tournament where the Paralympic draw took place featured 7 of the 8 teams participating in Rio.  It was the last major preparation event ahead of the Rio Games for all teams participating.  The United States finished 6th after beating Argentina in one placement match 4 - 3 and losing to Ireland 4 - 1.  The goals scored in the match against Argentina were the first the USA scored in the tournament, before putting up one more in their match against Ireland.   Their roster for this tournament included Alex Hendricks, Sean Boyle, Keith Johnson, David Garza, Joshua Brunais, Bryce Boarman, Gavin Sibayan, Adam Ballou, Gregory Brigman, Mason Abbiate, Andrew Bremer, Sam Holmes, Kevin Hensley and Steven Bohlemann.  They were coached by Stuart Sharp.

Going into the Rio Games, the country was ranked eighth in the world.

Goalball

Men 
The United States men's national goalball team qualified for the Rio Games after finishing third at the 2014 IBSA Goalball World Championships.  Joseph Hamilton, a member of the qualifying team, said after qualifying, "It’s overwhelming for our team, we’ve come a long way. We didn’t make the London 2012 Games that was very hard for us. To qualify for Rio at the first chance, and against a team that has been our nemesis in recent years, is awesome. If we play our own style, I believe we are one of the best teams in the world, and now we’ve got a chance to try to prove that on the grandest stage of all."  The team returns to the Paralympics after having missed out on qualifying for the 2012 Summer Paralympics in London. The United States' men enter the tournament ranked 9th in the world.

Women 
The United States women's national goalball team qualified for the Rio Games after finishing first at the 2014 IBSA Goalball World Championships.  The team goes to Rio having had a disappointing performance at the 2012 Summer Paralympics where they finished twelfth. Jen Armbruster's participation in Rio for the US women's national goalball team made for seven Games appearances.  This total was the second highest Games appearances among US athletes attending the Rio Games. The United States' women enter the tournament ranked 4th in the world.

Judo 

With one pathway for qualification being having a top finish at the 2014 IBSA Judo World Championships, the United States earned a qualifying spot in Rio base on the performance of Dartanyon Crockett in the men's -90 kg event.  The B3 Judoka finished first in his class.  Five judoka would eventually be named to the US squad in Rio, including returning Paralympian Dartanyon Crockett.  The other four judoka were Christella Garcia, Ben Goodrich, Myles Porter and Sarah Chung.

Paracanoe 

Paracanoer Alana Nichols had previously competed at the Paralympics in alpine skiing and wheelchair basketball.

Rowing 

One pathway for qualifying for Rio involved having a boat have top eight finish at the 2015 FISA World Rowing Championships in a medal event.  The United States qualified for the 2016 Games under this criteria in the AS Men's Single Sculls event with a fifth-place finish in a time of 04:59.510. The United States qualified a second boat in the AS Women's Single Sculls event with an eighth-place finish in a time of 05:49.760.  The United States qualified a third boat with a second-place finish in the LTA Mixed Coxed Four event in a time of 03:19.820.  This was less than a second behind the gold medal-winning boat, Great Britain, who had a time of 03:19.560.

At the US Olympic and Paralympic rowing team trials held in Sarasota, Florida in April 2016, Jacqui Kapinowski confirmed her qualification by winning the women's arms and shoulders single sculls (ASW1x) event in a time of 6 minutes 15.91 seconds, finishing ahead of second place athlete KateLynne Steinke by 15.61 seconds.

Jaclyn Smith  is the only visually impaired competitor for the USA.  She was scheduled to compete in the LTA Mix 4 event.

Sailing 

The American team qualified a boat for two of the three sailing classes at the Games through their results at the 2014 Disabled Sailing World Championships held in Halifax, Nova Scotia, Canada. Places were earned in the solo 2.4mR event and a crew also qualified for the two-person SKUD-18 class.

An alternative pathway for qualifying for Rio involved having a boat have top seven finish at the 2015 Combined World Championships in a medal event where the country had nor already qualified through via the 2014 IFDS Sailing World Championships.  The Unite qualified for the 2016 Games under this criteria in the Sonar event with a sixth-place finish overall and the second country who had not qualified via the 2014 Championships.

Dee Smith, at 64 years of age, was the oldest member of the United States delegation in Rio.

Shooting 

The first opportunity to qualify for shooting at the Rio Games took place at the 2014 IPC Shooting World Championships in Suhl. Shooters earned spots for their NPC.  The United States earned a qualifying spot at this competition in the R4 – 10m Air Rifle Standing Mixed SH2  event as a result of McKenna Dahl. Michael Tagliapietra earned a second spot for the US, with this spot in the P3 – 25m Pistol Mixed SH1 event.

The third opportunity for direct qualification for shooters to the Rio Paralympics took place at the 2015 IPC Shooting World Cup in Sydney, Australia.  At this competition, John Joss III earned a qualifying spot for their country in the R6- Mixed 50m Rifle Prone SH1 event.

The last direct qualifying event for Rio in shooting took place at the 2015 IPC Shooting World Cup in Fort Benning in November. Tammy Delano earned a qualifying spot for their country at this competition in the R3 Mixed 10m Air Rifle Prone SH1 event. Jazmin Almlie earned a second spot for the United States at this event with her finished in the R4 Mixed Air Rifle Standing SH2 event.

John Joss III was one of three active service members competing at the Rio Games.

Sitting volleyball

Men 
United States men's national sitting volleyball team qualified for the 2016 Games at the 2015 Parapan American Games after winning a silver medal.  It marks the team's return to the Paralympic level after having last appeared in 2004.

Women 
United States women's national sitting volleyball team qualified for the 2016 Games at the 2014 World ParaVolley Sitting Volleyball World Championships.

Group

Semi-final

Final

Table tennis
Tahl Leibovitz class 9 and Pamela Fontaine class 3 will compete represent USA in table tennis.

Swimming 

American swimmers competed at the 2015 IPC Swimming World Championships as part of their Rio qualifying efforts. The top two finishers in each Rio medal event at the 2015 IPC Swimming World Championships earned a qualifying spot for their country for Rio. Bradley Sndyer earned the United States a spot after winning gold in the Men's 100m Freestyle S11 with a time of 0:56.78. Jessica Long is expected to represent the United States in Rio.  She had a strong performance at the 2015 IPC World Championships, winning seven medals, four of which were gold.

McClain Hermes is the youngest member of the United States Paralympic team.  They turned 15 in January 2016.  Jessica Long went to Rio as the most decorated American Paralympian at the Games.  She had 17 total medals prior to Rio. Elizabeth Marks was one of three active American service members competing at the Rio Games. The USA team included nine visually impaired swimmers.  These were Cailin Currie, Tharon Drake, Tucker Dupree, McClain Hermes, Letticia Martinez, Rebecca Meyers, Martha Reuther, Bradley Snyder and Colleen Young.

Triathlon 

Krige Schabort was a member of Team USA competing in the paratriathlon.  He previously served in the South African Army. Grace Norman and Allysa Seely competed in both athletics and the paratriathlon in Rio.

There were four visually impaired paratriathletes on the USA team.  They were Elizabeth Baker, Jillian Peterson, Particia Walsh and Jessica Jones Meyers.

Wheelchair basketball

Men 
The United States men's national wheelchair basketball team has qualified for the 2016 Rio Paralympics.  They qualified through via the 2015 Parapan Am Games.  They met Argentina in the semi-finals, whom they beat 59–36.  They then went to the gold match medal game, where they defeated Canada 62–39.

During the draw, Brazil had the choice of which group they wanted to be in.  They were partnered with Spain, who would be in the group Brazil did not select.  Brazil chose Group B, which included  Iran, the United States, Great Britain, Germany and Algeria.  That left Spain in Group A with Australia, Canada, Turkey, the Netherlands and Japan.

Trevon Jenifer was the shortest member of the Team USA in Rio.

Women 
The United States women's national wheelchair basketball team has qualified for the 2016 Rio Paralympics.  The women qualified after claiming gold at the Parapan Am Games in 2015 after defeating Canada 80–72.

As hosts, Brazil got to choose which group they were put into.  They were partnered with Algeria, who would be put in the group they did not chose.  Brazil chose Group A, which included Canada, Germany, Great Britain and Argentina.  Algeria ended up in Group B with the United States, the Netherlands, France and China.

Wheelchair rugby 
The United States qualified for the Rio Paralympics.  They were scheduled to open play in Rio against France on September 14.  Their second game was scheduled to be against Sweden on September 15.  Their final game of group play as against Japan on September 16.  The United States entered the tournament ranked number one in the world.

Wheelchair tennis 

The United States qualified two competitors in the men's single event as a result of Bipartite Commission Invitation places.  The players invited were Steve Baldwin and Jon Rydberg.  The United States qualified four players in the women's single event. Emmy Kaiser and Dana Mathewson qualified via the standard qualification route. Kaitlyn Verfuerth qualified via a Bipartite Commission Invitation place. Russia had qualified two player in the women's singles event, Ludmila Bubnova and Viktoriia Lvova.  Following their suspension, one spot was re-allocated by the IPC to the United States'  Shelby Baron.  The United States qualified three players in the quad singles event.  Nicholas Taylor and David Wagner qualified via the standard route. Bryan Barten qualified via a Bipartite Commission Invitation place.

See also
United States at the 2016 Summer Olympics

References 

Nations at the 2016 Summer Paralympics
2016
2016 in American sports